Amarilis is an American television actress.

Biography
She was born in New York City, then moved with her family to Los Angeles and then Riverside.

Career
She worked as a model and acted in ads and student film projects, before she made her professional debut as an actress in the role of Patty Gilbert in the syndicated TV series Sweet Valley High (1994-1997) and has guest starred on the TV series The Fresh Prince of Bel-Air. Amarilis portrayed the Marvel Comics superheroine Monet "M" St. Croix in the television movie Generation X.

Filmography

References

External links
 

Living people
Actresses from New York City
American female models
American television actresses
Models from New York City
Year of birth missing (living people)
20th-century American actresses